Stevan Sinđelić (1771 – 19 May 1809) was a Serbian revolutionary commander in Resava, who fought during the First Serbian Uprising (1804–1813) against Ottoman rule. As the commander of the Resava Brigade, he fought in many battles and skirmishes against Ottoman foot-soldiers, including the Battle of Ivankovac in 1805 and the Battle of Deligrad in 1806. He is remembered for his actions during the Battle of Čegar Hill in 1809, in which he and the Resava Brigade found themselves surrounded by the Ottomans. Encircled and without much chance of survival, Sinđelić ignited the gunpowder kegs in the powder cave, creating an enormous explosion that killed him, along with all of the Serbian and Ottoman soldiers in his trench.

Early life
Stevan Rakić was born in 1771, in the village of Grabovac in the Morava Okrug, Ottoman Smederevo (in present-day Svilajnac, Serbia). His father, zanatlija (craftsman) Radovan Rakić, died at a young age and his mother Sinđelija later remarried. People called him by the matronymic Sinđelić.

Before the Serbian Uprising, he worked for Duke Petar in Resava, whom the dahi murdered during the Slaughter of the Dukes massacre that would spark the revolution. Long before the start of the Uprising, Karađorđe Petrovic, when traveling cross the Velika Morava, met with Sinđelić and discussed the revolution with him. Later, Sinđelić gathered people from the Resava region to take part in the Uprising against the Ottoman government. He was notified directly as Karađorđe Petrović was chosen to lead the Uprising, proclaimed on 14 February 1804.

First Serbian Uprising
Steven Sinđelić, at the beginning of the First Serbian Uprising in 1804, formed a military  unit with other peasants in the Resava region. The Ottoman garrison, which was located in Ćuprija, immediately moved to crush the Serb revolutionaries. Sinđelić was informed of the Ottomans' actions by a spy and maneuvered his forces between the towns of Svilajnac and Ćuprija. The Ottomans were defeated.

Afterwards, Sinđelić fought in the Battle of Ivankovac (1805) with Milenko Stojković and Petar Dobrnjac, where the combined forces of the three military commanders defeated Ottoman General Hafis Pasha. In Ivankovac, Sinđelić proved himself as a good and capable military leader and he was subsequently appointed to be the Commander of the Resava Infantry Brigade by Karađorđe Petrović who was the commander-in-chief of the Serbian Revolutionary Army.

Sinđelić later fought the Ottomans in a guerrilla campaign in the Morava Valley and his forces liberated the towns of Ćuprija, Paraćin, Ražanj and many areas that were located just north of Deligrad. There, the Serbian forces became entrenched. They were awaited by the large Army of Ottoman Commander Huršid Pasha whose forces were stationed in the Niš Fortress. 
 
 
Stevan's Brigade fought the Ottomans in areas that were located south of the city of Niš. His detachment became entrenched in the village of Kamenica on Čegar hill, not far from the Ottoman front-line. The Serbs then launched several attacks against the Niš Fortress, but each time they were repulsed by the numerically superior Ottomans. After a two-month-long struggle, the Ottomans engaged in a counter-attack against the Serb positions on 19 May 1809 (N.S. 31 May). Sinđelić and his Brigade became separated from the remainder of the Serb guerrilla positions and he and his men resisted fiercely. With hundreds of Ottoman soldiers pouring into the trench, Sinđelić saw that his Brigade had little hope of staving off the Ottoman offensive. Hand-to-hand combat ensued in the trenches. Sinđelić decided to fire his flintlock pistol into a pile of gunpowder kegs. When the Ottomans swarmed the trench from all sides and headed for him, Sinđelić squeezed the trigger. The Serbs who remained in the trench with Sinđelić, as well as the attacking Ottomans, were all caught in the enormous explosion and perished. According to legend his famous last words were: "Save yourselves brothers, who wants and who can! Those who stay will die!". The fall of Sinđelić's trench forced the other units of the Serbian Revolutionary Army to retreat back to the town of Deligrad, where they entrenched themselves in a new, fortified front line.

It is estimated that over 6,000 Ottoman troops were killed during the explosion along with the surviving Serb revolutionaries (those who did not manage to escape the explosion, including Sinđelić).

Some 3,000 revolutionaries and all of the Ottoman troops that were present were killed in the Battle of Čegar at Čegar Hill. The Turks, following orders given by Hurşid Paşa of Niš, erected the famous Skull Tower (Ćele-Kula) on the road to Constantinople, containing 952 Serbian revolutionaries' skulls, as a warning to the Serbs and other Balkan peoples about any future dissident. Today, 57 skulls remain embedded into the walls of the Skull Tower in Niš.

See also

First Serbian Uprising
Skull Tower
Niš
 List of Serbian Revolutionaries

References

1771 births
1809 deaths
People of the First Serbian Uprising
People from Svilajnac
Serbian revolutionaries
Serbian military personnel killed in action
Trophy heads
Rebels from the Ottoman Empire
19th-century Serbian people